A Life to Die For is the 12th studio album by Royal Hunt.

Track listing
All songs by André Andersen.

 Hell Comes Down from Heaven        (9:27)
 A Bullet's Tale                    (5:54)
 Running Out of Tears               (5:31)
 One Minute Left to Live            (5:49)
 Sign of Yesterday                  (6:02)
 Won't Trust, Won't Fear, Won't Beg (4:58)
 A Life to Die For                  (8:38)

European Digipack Edition Bonus DVD – World Tour 2012
 Tour Kick-off (1:25)
 Half Past Loneliness (7:49) - original from Show Me How to Live (2011)
 Hard Rain's Coming (12:50)) - original from Show Me How to Live (2011)
 Age Gone Wild (8:29) - original from Land of Broken Hearts (1992)
 Far Away (6:21) - original from Far Away [EP] (1995) / Moving Target (1995)
 Step by Step (5:59) - original from Moving Target (1995)
 Interview with André Andersen (8:13)

- 2, 3: recorded live in Seoul, Korea
- 4: recorded live in Moscow, Russia
- 5: recorded live in Madrid, Spain
- 6: recorded live in Ekaterinburg, Russia

Personnel

Band members
André Andersen – keyboards, rhythm guitar, producer
Jonas Larsen – lead guitar
Allan Sørensen - drums
D.C. Cooper – lead vocals
Andreas Passmark – bass

Additional musicians
Kenny Lubcke - backing vocals
Alexandra Popova - backing vocals
Michelle Raitzin - add. lead vocals (2)
Jacob Kjær - guitar (3: solo)
Soma Allpass - strings
Christina Lund - strings
Patricia Skovgaard - strings
Christina Larsen - strings
Erik Rosenqvist - brass, woodwinds
Mads Kofoed - brass, woodwinds
CV Company - choir

Charts

References

Royal Hunt albums
2013 albums